Lionel O. Booth (12 June 1914 – 31 May 1997) was an Irish Fianna Fáil politician and businessman. He was a Teachta Dála (TD) for twelve years, from 1957 to 1969.

He was educated at Wesley College, Dublin, The Leys School, Cambridge, and Trinity College Dublin. He qualified as a solicitor in 1938 and served as a captain in the Army during the Emergency.

He first entered politics in the 1950s serving on both Dublin County Council and Dún Laoghaire Corporation. He stood unsuccessfully at the 1954 general election, and was first elected to Dáil Éireann at the 1957 general election for the Dún Laoghaire and Rathdown constituency. He was re-elected at each subsequent general election, but did not contest the 1969 general election and retired from politics.

Booth is probably best be remembered as an astute businessman. He was both the joint managing director of Booth Poole & Co Ltd from 1956 and managing director of the Brittain Group from 1970.

References

1914 births
1997 deaths
Businesspeople from County Dublin
Fianna Fáil TDs
Irish solicitors
Members of the 16th Dáil
Members of the 17th Dáil
Members of the 18th Dáil
People educated at Wesley College, Dublin
Politicians from County Dublin
Alumni of Trinity College Dublin
People educated at The Leys School